Lerato Joel Kgoatle (born 9 September 1993) is a South African cricketer. He was included in the Northerns cricket team squad for the 2015 Africa T20 Cup. In September 2018, he was named in Limpopo's squad for the 2018 Africa T20 Cup. In September 2019, he was named in Limpopo's squad for the 2019–20 CSA Provincial T20 Cup. In his first four innings of the tournament, he scored two unbeaten centuries.

References

External links
 

1993 births
Living people
South African cricketers
Limpopo cricketers
Northerns cricketers
People from Mamelodi